Elizabeth Marie "Dearie" Mulvey (née McKeever; June 1898 – November 24, 1968) was the co-owner of the Brooklyn Dodgers of the National League from  through , then 25 percent minority owner through her death, with her husband, James Mulvey.  In 1938, she inherited one-quarter share of the club from her father Stephen McKeever's estate.  In 1950, Walter O'Malley assumed majority control of the Dodgers.  The Mulvey's minority share was purchased by O'Malley in 1975, 17 years after the team moved from Brooklyn to Los Angeles.

She died at White Plains, New York in 1968 after recent years of declining health. She was survived by her husband and 3 children.

References

External links
Los Angeles Dodgers owners

Major League Baseball owners
Brooklyn Dodgers owners
Los Angeles Dodgers owners
1898 births
1968 deaths